Tamara Steeves (born September 23, 1989) is a Canadian 1.5 point wheelchair basketball player from Etobicoke, Ontario who won a gold medal in the 2009  Artland Open which was hosted in Quakenbruck, Germany and in 2011 bronze medal at Osaka Cup which was hosted in Osaka, Japan. She also won a silver medal at Canada Games in her home town Ontario the same year.

In 2013, she received the Queen Elizabeth II Diamond Jubilee Medal which was given to her by Minister of State Bal Gosal.

In 2016 she was chosen to represent Canada at the 2016 Summer Paralympics. She was also ranked as top athlete with a disability by the Mississauga Sports Council in 2012.

References

External links
 
 

1989 births
Living people
Paralympic wheelchair basketball players of Canada
Canadian women's wheelchair basketball players
Sportspeople from Etobicoke
Wheelchair basketball players at the 2012 Summer Paralympics
Wheelchair basketball players at the 2016 Summer Paralympics
Wheelchair basketball players at the 2020 Summer Paralympics
20th-century Canadian women
21st-century Canadian women
Commonwealth Games medallists in basketball
Commonwealth Games gold medallists for Canada
Medallists at the 2022 Commonwealth Games